The Tamsa River is a tributary of the Ganges flowing through  the Indian states of Madhya Pradesh and Uttar Pradesh.

Course
It flows through the fertile districts of Satna and Rewa. At the edge of the Purwa plateau, the Tamsa and its tributaries form many waterfalls.

The Tamsa River while descending through the Rewa Plateau and draining northwards makes a vertical fall of 70m known as Purwa Falls. Some of the more notable waterfalls on the tributaries of the Tamsa river, as they come down from the Rewa Plateau, are: Chachai Falls (127m) on the Beehar River, a tributary of the Tamsa, the Keoti Falls (98m) on the Mahana River, a tributary of the Tamsa, and Odda Falls (145m) on the Odda River, a tributary of the Belah River, which is itself a tributary of the Tamsa,
Actually, the Tamsa River described in Valmiki Ramayana is a seasonal rivulet, originates somewhere in Barabanki, and flows through the Ayodhya district to Darban lake in Tanda tehsil in Ambedkar Nagar. 
This river is left side of Ganga and Gomti. Thus has no relation to Reva or Madhya Pradesh.

Significance 
This river has also got importance in Hinduism. As this is the river on which Shri Ram spent his first night during the 14 years of forest exile. When Shri Ram left Ayodhya people followed him and were not ready to return to their homes. In the evening Shri Ram, Lakshman and Sita and all the people reached the banks of the Tamsa. Shri Ram and everyone agreed to spend the night at the banks of the Tamsa river and continue the journey next morning. Shri Ram left people sleeping and continued the journey further.)

The Ashrama of sage Valmiki was at the banks of Tamsa river. When Mata Sita was exiled by Shri Ram, she left Ayodhya and came to the banks of Tamsa river some 15  km away from the city, where she met Valmiki. He requested Sita to live in his ashrama situated at the bank of the Tamsa river. Here Sita spent all her remaining life, and here her twin sons Lava and Kusha received education and trained in military skills under the tutelage of Valmiki.

Also on the banks of river Tamsa was the ashram of Bharadwaj, mentioned in the Valmiki Ramayana; it is here that on seeing the plight a bird couple, Valmiki created his first verse, shloka.

Towns And villages situated on Tamsa River
Teonthar
Pathrahta
Cheruia 
Pipraon
Malpar
Chakghat
Meja
Maihar
Mau
Ballia
Azamgarh
Ambedkar Nagar district

References

External links
 
 Tamas River wikimapia

Rivers of Madhya Pradesh
Rivers of Uttar Pradesh
Tributaries of the Ganges
Ancient Indian rivers
Ganges basin
Rivers of India